Brian Clark may refer to:

 Brian Clark (writer) (1932–2021), English playwright and screenwriter
 Brian Clark (footballer, born 1943) (1943–2010), English footballer
 Brian Clark (Scottish footballer) (born 1988), Scottish footballer
 Brian D. Clark (born 1956), Pennsylvania politician
 Brian Clark (American football) (born 1983), American football wide receiver
 Brian Clark (Canadian football) (born 1974), former Canadian Football League linebacker
 Brian Clark (September 11 survivor) (born 1947), Canadian survivor of the attacks on the World Trade Center on September 11, 2001
 Brian Clark (cricketer) (born 1964), Zimbabwean cricketer
 Brian Clark (rugby league), New Zealand rugby league player
 Brian Clark, candidate in the United States House of Representatives elections in Missouri, 2010

See also 
 Bryan Clark (born 1964), American wrestler
 Bryan Clark (American football) (born 1960), American football player
 Bryan Clark (baseball) (born 1956), American baseball player
 Bryan Clarke (1932–2014), British academic
 Brian Clarke (disambiguation)